Kitchen United is a ghost kitchen company based in Pasadena, California, providing equipped professional kitchen space to restaurants for the preparation of delivery-only meals. This allows brick-and-mortar restaurants to expand their food delivery business without adding extra staff or space and allows the creation of restaurants with no dine-in service. In addition to commercial kitchen space, it provides back of house automation and ordering software that accommodates the main delivery services (DoorDash, GrubHub, Uber Eats, etc.).

The company was initially funded by GV (formerly Google Ventures), which invested $10 million. GV also contributed to a $40-million series B round of funding that included Fidelity Investments, G Squared Capital and RXR Realty. The company raised a $100-million series C round of funding in July 2021 that included Restaurant Brands International, Kroger, and Couche-Tard / Circle K.

References 

Food and drink companies of the United States
American companies established in 2017
Food and drink companies established in 2017
2017 establishments in California
Companies based in Pasadena, California